Best EP Selection of Tokio II is the second compilation album by Japanese band Tokio. It was released on May 9, 2001. It is the band's second of three compilation albums, with the first being, Best E.P Selection of Tokio. It reached sixth place on the Oricon weekly chart and charted for nine weeks.

Track listing

Personnel 

 Shigeru Joshima - guitar
 Tomoya Nagase - lead vocalist, guitar
 Masahiro Matsuoka - drums
 Taichi Kokubun - keyboard
 Tatsuya Yamaguchi - bass

References 

2001 greatest hits albums
Tokio (band) albums